Jeffrey Bruce Jacobs  (19 September 1943 – 24 November 2019) was an American-born Australian orientalist who specialized in Taiwan studies. He taught at La Trobe University before joining the faculty at Monash University as professor of Asian languages and studies, where he was granted emeritus status upon retirement. In Taiwan, he was known as Chia Po, a simplified transliteration of his surname, or by the nickname Big Beard.

Life and career
J. Bruce Jacobs was born on 19 September 1943 in the United States, and educated at Columbia University, where he earned bachelor's, master's, and doctoral degrees. While completing master's-level coursework, Jacobs spent 1965 and 1966 in Taiwan, with the History Research Institute of National Taiwan University. Jacobs finished his master's degree in 1970. He returned to Taiwan between 1971 and 1973, during his doctoral study, which he completed in 1975. In 1976, Jacobs was named a lecturer at La Trobe University. In 1980, Jacobs was detained for three months, and falsely accused of involvement in the stabbing death of Lin Yi-hsiung's mother, as well as the  born to Lin and Fang Su-min. In its coverage of the murders, the United Daily News became the first publication to refer to Jacobs as "Big Beard." Following his departure from Taiwan in May 1980, Jacobs was barred by the Kuomintang government from entering Taiwan until 1992.

In the early 1990s, Jacobs was appointed to the Australia-China Council. He began teaching at Monash University in 1991, and was granted emeritus status upon retirement in 2014. Jacobs received the Order of Brilliant Star with Grand Cordon from the government of the Republic of China in November 2018, and was named a member of the Order of Australia in the 2019 Queen's Birthday Honours. Jacobs was diagnosed with pancreatic cancer in 2017, and died in Melbourne on 24 November 2019, aged 76.

Publications
Several opinion pieces written by Jacobs were published in the Taipei Times. While writing for that publication, he argued that a paradigm shift was necessary in Taiwanese politics and diplomatic efforts, while comparing the one-China policy to the flat Earth model. Jacobs also opined on the teaching of Taiwanese history, the Senkaku Islands dispute, territorial disputes in the South China Sea, and Cross-Strait as well as foreign relations of Taiwan. In 2013, Jacobs argued for Taiwan's status as a middle power. Many of Jacobs' writings took the form of an open letter in which he discussed a wide array of topics relating to politics in Taiwan. Such letters were specifically addressed to Taiwanese politicians Wang Ching-feng, Ma Ying-jeou, and generally to Taiwanese people, as well as Canadian prime minister Justin Trudeau and Qantas chief executive officer Alan Joyce. Jacobs regularly penned electoral analyses for the Taipei Times, including in 2004, 2005, 2008's presidential and legislative election, 2010, 2014, 2016, and 2018.

In written and spoken commentary, Jacobs was critical of Su Chi, as well as the presidency of Chen Shui-bian. He also discussed the loss of Taiwan-centric publications Taiwan Communique and Thinking Taiwan, which both ceased publication in 2016. In Lee Teng-hui and the Idea of Taiwan Jacobs and I-hao Ben Liu discussed Lee Teng-hui's contribution to Taiwan's democratization, Taiwanization, and Taiwanese nationalism. Jacobs wrote a number of books about Taiwan, which included Local Politics in Rural Taiwan under Dictatorship and Democracy (2008), Democratizing Taiwan (2012), The Kaohsiung Incident in Taiwan and Memoirs of a Foreign Big Beard (2016), and Changing Taiwanese Identities (2018, edited with Peter Kang).

List of publications

References

1943 births
2019 deaths
American emigrants to Australia
Columbia University alumni
Academic staff of La Trobe University
Academic staff of Monash University
21st-century Australian male writers
21st-century American male writers
20th-century Australian male writers
20th-century American male writers
Members of the Order of Australia
Recipients of the Order of Brilliant Star
Deaths from cancer in Victoria (Australia)
American expatriates in Taiwan
Australian memoirists
Australian political commentators
Australian orientalists
Deaths from pancreatic cancer
20th-century American non-fiction writers
21st-century Australian non-fiction writers
20th-century Australian non-fiction writers
Naturalised citizens of Australia
20th-century letter writers